Pablo Cuevas and David Marrero were the defending champions, but Marrero chose not to participate this year. Cuevas played alongside Marcel Granollers, but lost in the quarterfinals to Vasek Pospisil and Jack Sock.
Bob and Mike Bryan won the title, defeating Pospisil and Sock in the final, 2–6, 6–3, [10–7].

Seeds
All seeds receive a bye into the second round.

Draw

Finals

Top half

Bottom half

References
 Main Draw

Italian Open - Doubles
Men's Doubles